Erdmannhausen is a town in the district of Ludwigsburg in Baden-Württemberg in Germany.

History
The Counts Württemberg began acquiring more and more of the village until it fully came under their control in 1425. From the 15th century to 1938, Erdmannhausen was assigned to the district of Marbach am Neckar, which was dissolved and replaced by Landkreis Ludwigsburg.

Geography
The municipality (Gemeinde) of Erdmannhausen is located at the eastern extremity of the district of Ludwigsburg, in the German state of Baden-Württemberg, along the border with the Rems-Murr district. Erdmannhausen is physically located in  the Neckar. Elevation above sea level in the municipal area ranges from a high of  Normalnull (NN) to a low of  NN.

Politics
Erdmannhausen has one borough (Ortsteil), Erdmannhausen, and two villages, Bugmühle and Lemberghöfe. There are four abandoned villages, Äußeres Höfle, Eglolfshofen, Inneres Höfle, and Weikershausen.

Coat of arms
Erdmannhausen's coat of arms displays a crosier, in gold, upon a field of blue, below a yellow chief containing a black . This coat of arms was designed and accepted by Erdmannhausen's municipal council on 2 June 1954, and was confirmed on 19 October 1954 by the government of Baden-Württemberg and a municipal flag issued.

Transportation
Erdmannhausen is connected to Germany's network of roadways by its local Landesstraßen and Kreisstraßen and to Germany's railway system by the Backnang–Ludwigsburg railway and the Stuttgart S-Bahn. Local public transportation is provided by the Verkehrs- und Tarifverbund Stuttgart.

References

External links

  (in German)

Ludwigsburg (district)